Chrastavec is a municipality and village in Svitavy District in the Pardubice Region of the Czech Republic. It has about 200 inhabitants.

Administrative parts
The village of Půlpecen is an administrative part of Chrastavec.

References

Villages in Svitavy District